Bytovia Bytów is a Polish semi-professional association football club based in Bytów, Poland, founded in 1946. Bytovia currently plays in the IV liga Pomerania.

Players

Current squad

Out on loan

League history

Honours
1/8 Polish Cup - 2009/2010
Third Division Runners-up - 2013/2014
Second Division 8. position
1/4 Polish Cup - 2016/2017

References

External links
 Official page 
 Bytovia Bytów (90minut.pl) 

 
Football clubs in Poland
Association football clubs established in 1946
1946 establishments in Poland
Football clubs in Pomeranian Voivodeship